Timothy Robert Corcoran (June 4, 1950 – November 6, 2014) was an American Democratic Party politician who served from 1981 to 1995 in the Vermont House of Representatives. He resigned from the body in 1995 after being elected town clerk of Bennington, Vermont, a position he held until he died in 2014. His son, Timothy Corcoran II, has been a member of the House since 2002.

References

External links
 

1950 births
2014 deaths
People from Bennington, Vermont
Military personnel from Vermont
Southern Vermont College alumni
Democratic Party members of the Vermont House of Representatives
20th-century American politicians